DBeaver is a SQL client software application and a database administration tool. For relational databases it uses the JDBC application programming interface (API) to interact with databases via a JDBC driver.  For other databases (NoSQL) it uses proprietary database drivers. It provides an editor that supports code completion and syntax highlighting.  It provides a plug-in architecture (based on the Eclipse plugins architecture) that allows users to modify much of the application's behavior to provide database-specific functionality or features that are database-independent.  This is a desktop application written in Java and based on Eclipse platform.

The community edition (CE) of DBeaver is a free and open source software that is distributed under the Apache License. A closed-source enterprise edition of DBeaver is distributed under a commercial license.

History
DBeaver was started in 2010 as a hobby project. It was supposed to be free and open-source with a good-looking and convenient UI and to include frequently used features for database developers.
The first official release was in 2011 on Freecode.
It quickly became a popular tool in the open-source community.

In the same year, the official web site was founded and the community support forum (now moved to GitHub) was created.
In 2012 an Eclipse plugin version was released - since then DBeaver has become one of the most popular database extensions for Eclipse (top 50-60 among all Eclipse extensions).

Shortly after, various software vendors started to integrate with DBeaver (mostly as an extensions to their proprietary Eclipse RCP products: Zend Studio, NXTware, DeltaDNA, etc.).

In 2014 the Enterprise Edition (EE) version was released. The EE version is based on CE but also provides support of NoSQL/BigData databases (Cassandra, MongoDB and Redis) and includes a few additional Eclipse plugins.

In 2015 DBeaver source code/community has moved to GitHub.

In 2017 DBeaver CE was relicensed under Apache License (starting from version 4.x).

In July 2017 DBeaver EE version became commercial in order to support CE version.

Supported platforms and languages
DBeaver is a cross-platform tool and works on platforms which are supported by Eclipse (Windows, Linux, MacOS X, Solaris). DBeaver is available in English, Chinese, Russian, Italian, and German.

Versions
Full list of all released versions

Community Edition
Community Edition (CE) is the initial version of DBeaver. It was released in 2010 and became open-source (GPL) in 2011.
CE version includes extended support of the following databases: 
 MySQL and MariaDB
 PostgreSQL
 Greenplum
 Oracle
 IBM Db2
 EXASOL
 SQL Server
 Sybase
 Firebird
 Teradata
 Vertica
 SAP HANA
 Apache Phoenix
 Netezza
 Informix
 Apache Derby
 H2
 SQLite
 SnappyData
 Snowflake
 Any other database which has JDBC or ODBC driver.

Besides relational databases, CE version supports WMI driver (Windows Management Instrumentation – works only in Windows version).

Eclipse Plugin Edition
After a year, and in response to multiple user requests an Eclipse plugin version was released on Eclipse Marketplace. 
This version is used by programmers who use the Eclipse IDE for software development and need a database management tool right in their IDE. The Eclipse plugin includes most features of Community Edition and is also released under GPL license.

Enterprise Edition
DBeaver 3.x announced support of NoSQL databases (Cassandra and MongoDB in the initial version). Since then DBeaver was divided on Community and Enterprise editions.
Enterprise Edition has support of NoSQL databases, persistent query manager and a few other enterprise-level features. The EE version is not open-source and requires the purchase of a license (a trial license can be generated free of charge).
List of additional features:
 Cassandra
 MongoDB
 Redis
 Persistent QM
 JSON documents editor (mostly for MongoDB)
 Eclipse EE features (resources management, Marketplace UI)

Features
DBeaver features include:

 SQL queries execution
 Data browser/editor with a huge number of features
 Syntax highlighting and SQL auto-completion
 Database structure (metadata) browse and edit
 SQL scripts management
DDL generation
 ERD (Entity Relationship Diagrams) rendering
 SSH tunnelling
 SSL support (MySQL and PostgreSQL)
 Data export/migration
 Import, export and backup of data (MySQL and PostgreSQL)
 Mock data generation for database testing

There are differences in the features available across different databases.

See also

Comparison of database tools
HeidiSQL
SQuirreL SQL Client

References

External links
 

Data modeling tools
Database administration tools
Eclipse (software)
IBM DB2
Microsoft database software
MySQL
MariaDB
Oracle database tools
PostgreSQL
Software using the Apache license